The 2010-11 Qatari League or Qatari Stars League season was the 38th edition of the top level football championship in Qatar and started in September.

Teams
Al-Shamal were relegated to the second-level league after finishing bottom in the 2009–10 Qatar Stars League campaign. Al-Sailiya survived the drop after winning the end of season relegation/promotion playoff against Al-Mesaimeer

Lekhwiya were promoted as the 2nd level champions under there former name of Al-Shorta Doha or locally known as the Internal Security Forces (ISF).

Stadia and locations

1 Although this is classed as Al Khuratiyat SC home ground, the stadium is not up to Qatari Stars league standards, and the club uses other venues to host games
2 Formally known as Al Shorta

League table

Pre-Relegation Playoff
After finishing the season with the same number of points, Al-Ahli and Al-Sailiya faced each one in a tie played over one leg to decide which team relegates and which team faces Al-Shamal (2nd placed team of 2010-11 Qatar 2nd Division).

Relegation playoff

Fixtures and results

Top scorers

References

Qatar Stars League
Stars League